The 2012-13 Greek Ice Hockey Championship was contested by 11 teams, divided into Northern and Southern groups. The top two teams in each group were supposed to advance to the playoffs, which ended up being cancelled. PAOK Thessaloniki HC finished first in the Northern Group and Iptameni Pagodromoi Athens won the Southern Group, and were later named overall Greek champions.

Regular season

Northern Group

Southern Group

Playoffs
The two Northern Group teams who had qualified for the playoffs declined to participate. As a result, the playoffs were cancelled, and the Greek Federation declared Iptameni Pagodromoi Athens, winner of the Southern Group, Greek champion for 2013.

References

External links
Season on eurohockey.com

Gre 
Champ 
Greek Ice Hockey Championship seasons